The Times Literary Supplement (TLS) is a weekly literary review published in London by News UK, a subsidiary of News Corp.

History
The TLS first appeared in 1902 as a supplement to The Times but became a separate publication in 1914. Many distinguished writers have contributed, including T. S. Eliot, Henry James and Virginia Woolf. Reviews were normally anonymous until 1974, when signed reviews were gradually introduced during the editorship of John Gross. This aroused great controversy. "Anonymity had once been appropriate when it was a general rule at other publications, but it had ceased to be so", Gross said. "In addition I personally felt that reviewers ought to take responsibility for their opinions."

Martin Amis was a member of the editorial staff early in his career. Philip Larkin's poem "Aubade", his final poetic work, was first published in the Christmas-week issue of the TLS in 1977. While it has long been regarded as one of the world's pre-eminent critical publications, its history is not without gaffes: it missed James Joyce entirely, and commented only negatively on Lucian Freud from 1945 until 1978, when a portrait of his appeared on the cover.

Its editorial offices are based in The News Building, London. It is edited by Martin Ivens, who succeeded Stig Abell in June 2020.

The TLS has included essays, reviews and poems by D. M. Thomas, John Ashbery, Italo Calvino, Patricia Highsmith, Milan Kundera, Philip Larkin, Mario Vargas Llosa, Joseph Brodsky, Gore Vidal, Orhan Pamuk, Geoffrey Hill and Seamus Heaney, among others.

Many writers have described the publication as indispensable; Mario Vargas Llosa, novelist and the 2010 winner of the Nobel Prize in Literature, had once described the TLS as "the most serious, authoritative, witty, diverse and stimulating cultural publication in all the five languages I speak".

Editors
 1902: James Thursfield
 1902: Bruce Richmond
 1938: D. L. Murray (David Leslie Murray)
 1945: Stanley Morison
 1948: Alan Payan Pryce-Jones
 1959: Arthur Crook
 1974: John Gross
 1981: Jeremy Treglown
 1991: Ferdinand Mount
 2003: Peter Stothard
 2016: Stig Abell
 2020: Martin Ivens

See also
 The New York Review of Books
 London Review of Books
 List of literary magazines

References

Further reading
May, Derwent. Critical Times: The History of the Times Literary Supplement, 2001, HarperCollins, .

External links
 
 

1902 establishments in the United Kingdom
Book review magazines
Literary magazines published in the United Kingdom
Magazines established in 1902
Magazines published in London
Newspaper supplements
News UK
Weekly magazines published in the United Kingdom
The Times